Estádio Chiveve is a multi-purpose stadium in Beira, Mozambique.  It is currently used mostly for football matches and is the home stadium of Grupo Desportivo da Companhia Têxtil do Punguè.  The stadium holds 5,000 people.  

Chiveve
Buildings and structures in Beira, Mozambique
Multi-purpose stadiums in Mozambique
Buildings and structures in Sofala Province